Buffalo Hart Township is located in Sangamon County, Illinois. As of the 2010 census, its population was 173 and it contained 83 housing units.  The township centers on the crossroads unincorporated community of Buffalo Hart and on the adjacent Buffalo Hart Grove, the remains of a historic grove of trees that once stood out amongst the tallgrass prairie of the pioneer township.

Geography

Demographics

References

External links
City-data.com
Illinois State Archives

Townships in Sangamon County, Illinois
Springfield metropolitan area, Illinois
Townships in Illinois